In mathematics, a flow formalizes the idea of the motion of particles in a fluid.  Flows are ubiquitous in science, including engineering and physics. The notion of flow is basic to the study of ordinary differential equations. Informally, a flow may be viewed as a continuous motion of points over time. More formally, a flow is a group action of the real numbers on a set.

The idea of a vector flow, that is, the flow determined by a vector field, occurs in the areas of differential topology, Riemannian geometry and Lie groups. Specific examples of vector flows include the geodesic flow, the Hamiltonian flow, the Ricci flow, the mean curvature flow, and Anosov flows.  Flows may also be defined for systems of random variables and stochastic processes, and occur in the study of ergodic dynamical systems.  The most celebrated of these is perhaps the Bernoulli flow.

Formal definition
More explicitly, a flow is a mapping

Then, for all  the mapping  is a bijection with inverse  This follows from the above definition, and the real parameter   may be taken as a generalized functional power, as in function iteration.

Flows are usually required to be compatible with structures furnished on the set .  In particular, if   is equipped with a topology, then  is usually required to be continuous. If   is equipped with a differentiable structure, then  is usually required to be differentiable. In these cases the flow forms a one-parameter group of homeomorphisms and diffeomorphisms, respectively.

In certain situations one might also consider s, which are defined only in some subset

This is often the case with the flows of vector fields.

Alternative notations 
It is very common in many fields, including engineering, physics and  the study of differential equations, to use a notation that makes the flow implicit. Examples are given below.

In the case of a flow of a vector field  on a smooth manifold , the flow is often denoted in such a way that its generator is made explicit. For example,

Orbits 
If the flow is generated by a vector field, then its orbits are the images of its integral curves.

Examples

Algebraic equation 
Let  be a time-dependent trajectory which is a bijective function, i.e, non-periodic function. Then a flow can be defined by

Autonomous systems of ordinary differential equations 
Let  be a (time-independent) vector field
and  the solution of the initial value problem

Then  is the flow of the vector field . It is a well-defined local flow provided that the vector field 
 is Lipschitz-continuous. Then  is also Lipschitz-continuous wherever defined. In general it may be hard to show that the flow  is globally defined, but one simple criterion is that the vector field  is compactly supported.

Time-dependent ordinary differential equations 
In the case of time-dependent vector fields , one denotes  where  is the solution of

It is not a "flow" by the definition above, but it can easily be seen as one by rearranging its arguments. Namely, the mapping

indeed satisfies the group law for the last variable:

One can see time-dependent flows of vector fields as special cases of time-independent ones by the following trick. Define

Then  is the solution of the "time-independent" initial value problem

if and only if  is the solution of the original time-dependent initial value problem. Furthermore, then the mapping  is exactly the flow of the "time-independent" vector field .

Flows of vector fields on manifolds 
The flows of time-independent and time-dependent vector fields are defined on smooth manifolds exactly as they are defined on the Euclidean space  and their local behavior is the same. However, the global topological structure of a smooth manifold is strongly manifest in what kind of global vector fields it can support, and flows of vector fields on smooth manifolds are indeed an important tool in differential topology. The bulk of studies in dynamical systems are conducted on smooth manifolds, which are thought of as "parameter spaces" in applications.

Formally: Let  be a differentiable manifold. Let  denote the tangent space of a point  Let  be the complete tangent manifold; that is,  Let

Solutions of heat equation 
Denote by  its boundary (assumed smooth). 

The equation   on  corresponds to the Homogeneous Dirichlet boundary condition. The mathematical setting for this problem can be the semigroup approach.
 
(see the classical Sobolev spaces with  
and 
 

For any , we have

Thus, the flow corresponding to this equation is (see notations above)

Solutions of wave equation 
We denote by  its boundary (assumed smooth). 

Using the same semigroup approach as in the case of the Heat Equation above. We write the wave equation as a first order in time partial differential equation by introducing the following unbounded operator,

We introduce the column vectors  
 
(where  and ) and 

Thus, the flow corresponding to this equation is 

where  is the (unitary) semigroup generated by

Bernoulli flow 
Ergodic dynamical systems, that is, systems exhibiting randomness, exhibit  flows as well.  The most celebrated of these is perhaps the Bernoulli flow.  The Ornstein isomorphism theorem states that, for any given entropy , there exists a flow , called the Bernoulli flow, such that the flow at time , i.e. ,  is a Bernoulli shift.

Furthermore, this flow is unique, up to a constant rescaling of time.  That is, if ,  is another flow with the same entropy, then , for some constant .  The notion of uniqueness and isomorphism here is that of the isomorphism of dynamical systems.  Many dynamical systems, including Sinai's billiards and Anosov flows are isomorphic to Bernoulli shifts.

See also
Abel equation
Iterated function
Schröder's equation
Infinite compositions of analytic functions

References

 
 
 
 

Dynamical systems
Group actions (mathematics)